John de Ludlow (also Ludlaw) was an English medieval university chancellor.

In 1290, John de Ludlow was Chancellor of the University of Oxford, resigning in the same year.

See also
 Ludlow

References

Year of birth unknown
Year of death unknown
Chancellors of the University of Oxford
13th-century English people
English male writers